Clarkeulia is a genus of moths belonging to the family Tortricidae.

Species
Clarkeulia aerumnosa Razowski & Becker, 1984
Clarkeulia ardalio Razowski & Becker, 1984
Clarkeulia aulon Razowski & Becker, 1984
Clarkeulia bourquini (Clarke, 1949)
Clarkeulia conistra Razowski & Becker, 1984
Clarkeulia craterosema (Meyrick, 1912)
Clarkeulia deceptiva (Clarke, 1949)
Clarkeulia dimorpha (Clarke, 1949)
Clarkeulia dubia Razowski & Becker, 1984
Clarkeulia egena Razowski & Becker, 1984
Clarkeulia epistica (Clarke, 1949)
Clarkeulia excerptana (Walker, 1963)
Clarkeulia expedita Razowski & Becker, 1984
Clarkeulia exstinctrix (Meyrick, 1931)
Clarkeulia fortuita Razowski & Becker, 1984
Clarkeulia hamata Razowski & Wojtusiak, 2010
Clarkeulia lacrimosa Razowski & Becker, 1984
Clarkeulia licea Razowski & Becker, 1984
Clarkeulia magnana Razowski & Wojtusiak, 2009
Clarkeulia medanosa Razowski & Pelz, 2007
Clarkeulia mediana Razowski & Becker, 1984
Clarkeulia mitigata Razowski, 1997
Clarkeulia mulsa Razowski & Becker, 1984
Clarkeulia neoclyta Razowski, 1988
Clarkeulia oreographa (Meyrick, 1909)
Clarkeulia perversa Razowski & Becker, 1984
Clarkeulia placabilis Razowski & Becker, 1984
Clarkeulia radicana (Zeller, 1877)
Clarkeulia sellata (Razowski, 1982)
Clarkeulia semanota (Razowski, 1982)
Clarkeulia sematica (Razowski, 1982)
Clarkeulia semigrapha (Razowski, 1982)
Clarkeulia separabilis (Razowski, 1982)
Clarkeulia sepiaria (Razowski, 1982)
Clarkeulia seposita (Razowski, 1982)
Clarkeulia simera (Razowski, 1982)
Clarkeulia sonae (Clarke, 1949)
Clarkeulia spadix (Razowski, 1982)
Clarkeulia spectanda (Razowski, 1982)
Clarkeulia umbrifera Razowski & Becker, 1984
Clarkeulia virga (Clarke, 1949)

See also
List of Tortricidae genera

References

 , 2005: World Catalogue of Insects vol. 5 Tortricidae.
 , 1982, Bull. Acad. Pol. Sci., Sér. Sci. Biol. 30: 38.
 , 2009: Tortricidae (Lepidoptera) from the mountains of Ecuador and remarks on their geographical distribution. Part IV. Eastern Cordillera. Acta Zoologica Cracoviensia 51B (1-2): 119–187. doi:10.3409/azc.52b_1-2.119-187. Full article: .
 , 2010: Tortricidae (Lepidoptera) from Peru. Acta Zoologica Cracoviensia 53B (1-2): 73-159. . Full article:  .

External links
tortricidae.com

 
Euliini
Tortricidae genera